Lobonemoides is a genus of cnidarians belonging to the family Lobonematidae.

Species:

Lobonemoides gracilis 
Lobonemoides robustus 
Lobonemoides sewelli

References

Lobonematidae
Scyphozoan genera